Sicyases brevirostris is a species of clingfish from the family Gobiesocidae. It is endemic to the rocky intertidal zones of the Juan Fernández Islands, Chile. It was described in 1848 as Gobiesox brevirostris by Alphone Guichenot. Fishbase treats Sicyases hildebrandi as synonymous with S. brevirostris although some authorities still treat S. hildebrandi as a valid species.

References

Taxa named by Alphonse Guichenot
Fish described in 1848
brevirostris
Taxobox binomials not recognized by IUCN 
Endemic fauna of Chile